Sandra Nadege Uwayezu is a Rwandan author and poet based in Kigali. Nadege is the author of various poetry collections such as 'The First creation', 'Sense and Sensation' and a memoir titled 'Light in the Dark' .

She has been published in multiple magazines such as WSA magazine and The Swala Tribe. And also published on Rwandan medias include The New Times Rwanda.

Early life and education 
Born and raised in Kigali, the capital city of Rwanda, Nadege's childhood entailed experiences of self-isolation and depression, which sparked inspiration for her to start writing poems to express her thoughts and journey to healing. She finished her secondary studies from Saint Andre, and she is currently pursuing her Business Communication bachelor's degree at Southern New Hampshire University through Kepler University based in Kigali.

Career 
As a way of dealing trauma and depression from discrimination she faced in high school, in 2020 Nadege finished and published her first book titled First Creation, a collection of poetry. Nadege published her second book in November 2021, Light in the Dark, a short memoir of her story from 9 years to 16 years of age.

Books 
 First Creation
Light in the Dark

External resources 

 https://kepler.org/
 https://www.youtube.com/watch?v=UzNRlt89Jik

References

External links 

 https://allpoetry.com/Sandra_Nadege

Rwandan poets
2003 births
Rwandan women writers
Living people